4-Aminobiphenyl (4-APB) is an organic compound with the formula C6H5C6H4NH2. It is an amine derivative of biphenyl. It is a colorless solid, although aged samples can appear colored. 4-Aminobiphenyl was commonly used in the past as a rubber antioxidant and an intermediate for dyes. Exposure to this aryl-amine can happen through contact with chemical dyes and from inhalation of cigarette smoke. Researches showed that 4-aminobiphenyl is responsible for bladder cancer in humans and dogs by damaging DNA. Due to its carcinogenic effects, commercial production of 4-aminobiphenyl ceased in the United States in the 1950s.

Synthesis and reactivity
Like other aniline derivatives, 4-aminobiphenyl is weakly basic. It is prepared by reduction of 4-nitrobiphenyl, which, together with the 2-nitro derivatives, is obtained by nitration of biphenyl. Another reaction to synthesize 4-aminobiphenyl can be obtained by using 4-azidobiphenyl. This can be done by reacting 4-azidobiphenyl with diphosphorus tetraiodide (P2I4), which can cleave the nitrogen-nitrogen bond. This reaction is done in benzene and later on, water is added to promote the formation of amine.

Mechanism of action

General mechanism 
4-Aminobiphenyl causes DNA damage, which is thought to be mediated by formation of DNA adducts. In this process, 4-aminobiphenyl is oxidized in the liver giving the N-hydroxy derivative (4-aminobiphenyl-(NHOH)) by a cytochrome P450 isozyme. The final products of this metabolism are aryl nitrenium ions which form DNA adducts. During this process reactive oxygen species might also be produced and lead to oxidative DNA damage which might also play a role in the carcinogenesis. (N-hydroxy derivative causes oxidative DNA damage dramatically enhanced by NADH which leads to oxidation of 4-aminobiphenyl to a hydronitroxide radical). A linear correlation was found between adduct levels and the occurrence of liver tumors in female mice by comparing DNA adducts and tumorigenesis.

4-ABP leading to mutation in p53 gene 
One mechanism by which 4-ABP causes bladder cancer is a mutation in the p53 gene, which are seen in thirty to sixty percent of bladder cancer cases.  The p53 gene codes for the tumor suppressor p53 proteins.  A mutation in this gene can lead to formation of tumors.  Five p53 hotspots are known for bladder cancer. These are three CpG sites that are common hotspots in several human cancers, which are on codons 175, 248 and 273. The other two codons are 280 and 285 do not have CpG sites. These sites are unique hotspots for mutation in bladder cancer and other urinary tract cancers, which chemistry is not yet fully understood.

Metabolism process in humans
Cytochrome P450 1A2 oxidizes 4-aminobiphenyl to N-hydroxy-4-aminobiphenyl. Following O-acetylation, the latter can form DNA adducts. O-Acetylation reactions are catalyzed by NAT, N-acetyltransferase; and UDP-glucuronosyltransferase (UGT) enzymes. Two different enzymes can catalyze this reaction, NAT1 and NAT2. These enzymes can also N-acetylate 4-aminobiphenyl. N-Acetylated products are difficult to oxidize and because of this acetylation is considered a detoxification step for aromatic amines.

Glucuronidation also represents a major metabolic pathway for carcinogenic aromatic amines. A certain human UGT catalyzes the formation of the N-glucuronide of 4-aminobiphenyl. Glucuronidation results in inactivation and excretion, therefore N-glucuronidation also competes with N-oxidation.4-aminobiphenyl is proposed to initiate bladder cancer by a mechanism involving hepatic N-oxidation and subsequent N-glucuronidation. The N-hydroxy aryl amine N-glucuronide conjugate is thought to be excreted from the liver and to build up in the bladder lumen. N-glucuronides of 4-aminobiphenyl and N-hydroxy-4-aminobiphenyl can be hydrolyzed by acidic urine to their corresponding arylamines, they can in turn enter the bladder epithelium and undergo further metabolism by peroxidation and/or O-acetylation to form DNA adducts.

Toxicity

Human toxicity 
Toxic fumes arise from this compound when heated to decomposition. Excessive inhalation exposure of 4-aminobiphenyl may induce acute toxicity such as headache, lethargy, cyanosis and burning sensations mainly in the urinary tract.

4-Aminobiphenyl is a human carcinogen, specifically to the tissues involving the urinary system, i.e., the bladder, ureter, and renal pelvis. In one study, out of 171 workers in a plant manufacturing 4-aminobiphenyl, 11% of them developed bladder tumors. Tumors appeared on subjects which were exposed by 4-aminobiphenyl in a range of duration from 1.5 to 19 years. The compound can be metabolized by humans which the product may form adducts with DNA in human urothelial mucosa and bladder tumor tissues. Levels of these adducts in smokers of blond and black tobacco were found to be proportional to bladder cancer risk.

Animal toxicity 
The  (dogs, oral) is 25 mg/kg.  The oral LD50 for rats are 500 mg/kg body weight and for rabbits are 690 mg/kg body weight. Repeated oral administration of a 25% 4-aminobiphenyl solution in olive oil led rabbits to weight loss, anemia, decrease in the number of lymphocytes, increase of granulocytes or the rod neutrophilic granulocyte and to a pronounced hematuria or hemoglobinuria.

References

Anilines
IARC Group 1 carcinogens
Hazardous air pollutants
Biphenyls